Tineta Couturier, better known as Tineta, (born August 24, 1972), is a Canadian country music artist. She released two albums on Royalty Records, Love on the Line (1991) and Drawn to the Fire (1995). Her 1995 single "Walkin' That Line" reached the Top 20 of the RPM Country Tracks chart.

Discography

Albums

Singles

References

Canadian women country singers
Living people
1972 births
Musicians from Alberta
People from Red Deer, Alberta
21st-century Canadian women singers